Batangafo Airport  is an airport serving Batangafo, a city on the Ouham River in the Ouham prefecture of the Central African Republic. The airport is on the northeastern edge of the city, just off the RN4 road.

See also

Transport in the Central African Republic
List of airports in the Central African Republic

References

External links 
OpenStreetMap - Batangafo
OurAirports - Batangafo Airport
FallingRain - Batangafo Airport

Airports in the Central African Republic
Buildings and structures in Ouham